Disney–ABC Domestic Television (doing business as Disney–ABC Home Entertainment and Television Distribution, and formerly named Buena Vista Television) is the in-home sales and content distribution firm of Disney Platform Distribution, a subsidiary of Disney Entertainment, which is division of The Walt Disney Company. Content distribution responsibilities include domestic television syndication, domestic pay TV, Internet and cable video-on-demand (VOD), and pay-per-view outlets. Disney–ABC Domestic TV replaces the original 20th Television since August 10, 2020, and is currently running as a syndication and distribution arm.

Background
ABC's first syndication arm, ABC Films (established in July 1953), was spun off as Worldvision Enterprises (now CBS Media Ventures) in March 1973 due to fin-syn laws (which have since been repealed).

Despite having some TV shows and feature films, Disney only had two syndicated shows, The Mickey Mouse Club and The Mouse Factory, prior to the formation of this unit.

History

Buena Vista Television, Inc.
Disney established a television syndication unit in 1985, with Robert Jacquemin as senior vice president of domestic television distribution. None of its animated feature films were planned to enter syndication at the time. The division was incorporated as Buena Vista Television, Inc. on November 5, 1985, with its first release in the first-run syndication market called Siskel & Ebert.  The company produced the business-oriented morning show, Today's Business, in August 1986, only to put an end to the show in April 1987, indicating that they were unable to get enough advertisers. In 1990, the company offered its first game show, The Challengers, into first-run syndication.

In late 1986, Buena Vista was shopping DuckTales for a 1987 debut, with a 4–6 p.m. placement and a 2.5/3.5 syndicator/station ad split. In late 1990 and early 1991, after launching The Disney Afternoon syndicated block, Buena Vista had considered starting a new one-hour morning block to start in 1992.

On August 24, 1994, a reorganization of Disney took place in which Richard H. Frank became head of a newly formed Walt Disney Television and Telecommunications, which was split from Walt Disney Studios and included Buena Vista TV.

In April 1996, due to the ongoing post Disney–Capital Cities/ABC Inc. merger realignment and the retirement of its president, Walt Disney Television and Telecommunications' divisions were reassigned to other groups. Therefore, Buena Vista TV, as a part of Walt Disney Television International, was transferred to Disney–ABC Television Group.

In February 1997, Buena Vista began development on the Comedy Central original daytime game show Win Ben Stein's Money, presided over by actor, financial planner, motivator and author Ben Stein. The series debuted July 27, 1997 on Comedy Central; and Jimmy Kimmel was named co-host and quizmaster opposite Stein himself.

In March 2007, Starz Inc. sued Buena Vista TV for breaching their agreement by allowing films to be available online through Apple Inc.'s iTunes Store and other outlets. The introduction of the Apple TV device forced Starz to file suit, which hinged on the "contractual definition of 'television'" and whether complete TV exclusivity was granted, as Starz then had a secondary distribution deal with Netflix.

Disney–ABC Domestic Television
In May 2007, The Walt Disney Company announced plans to semi-retire the use of the Buena Vista brand in favor of focusing on the three core brands of Disney, ABC, and ESPN instead. As a result, Buena Vista Television was rebranded as Disney–ABC Domestic Television (DADT). Buena Vista TV converted to a limited liability business form on April 10, 2009.

By July 2008, Disney–ABC Domestic TV signed additional carriage agreements with Vudu and CinemaNow, which was then added to the Starz lawsuit. On December 2, 2008, Disney–ABC Domestic TV and Starz Entertainment settled their online distribution lawsuit with the terms undisclosed.

Distribution units were transferred to Walt Disney Direct-to-Consumer and International (DTCI) as part of The Walt Disney Company’s March 14, 2018 strategic reorganization in anticipation of integrating 21st Century Fox's assets. In February 2020, Disney licensed 21 TV series, from Ally McBeal to Witches of East End including Lost and Desperate Housewives, to Amazon-owned IMDb ad supported streaming service. On August 10, 2020, Disney–ABC Domestic TV took over the syndication function of the original 20th Television.

First-run programming

Current 
 Live with Kelly and Ryan (1988–present) produced by WABC-TV
 Tamron Hall (2019–present) produced by Summerdale Productions and ABC News
 Litton's Weekend Adventure (2011–present) E/I programming block from Litton Entertainment; exclusively for ABC affiliates

Films
The Walt Disney Studios libraries (including Walt Disney Pictures, Marvel Studios, Lucasfilm, 20th Century Studios, Searchlight Pictures, Touchstone Pictures and Hollywood Pictures) except Titanic and Braveheart (both distributed by Paramount Pictures in North America)

Off-net syndication 
 Family Guy (2007–present)
 The Simpsons (1994–present)
 Modern Family (2013–present)
 Bob's Burgers (2015–present)
 Last Man Standing (2017–present)
 Black-ish (2018–present)

Former
 At the Movies (1986–2010), originally Siskel & Ebert & the Movies/At the Movies with Ebert and Roeper 
 Bill Nye the Science Guy (1993–1998), with KCTS Seattle and Rabbit Ears Productions
 Debt (1996–1998), with Faded Denim Productions and Lifetime
 Ellen (1994–1998), with The Black/Marlens Company and Touchstone Television
 FABLife (2015–2016), with Summerdale Productions and The Tyra Banks Company
 Legend of the Seeker (2008–2010)
 Iyanla (2001–2002)
 Katie (2012–2014)
Nightmare Ned (1997) (seen on sister network ABC)
On the Red Carpet (2013–2014)
 Right This Minute (2016–2022) produced by MagicDust Television, Cox Media Group, Gray Television and E. W. Scripps Company. Previously distributed in syndication by Sony Pictures Television from 2011 to 2013 and MGM Worldwide Television and Digital Distribution from 2013 until 2016.
 Pickler & Ben (2017–2019), with E. W. Scripps Company, Happy Street Entertainment and Sandbox Entertainment
 Teen Win, Lose or Draw (1989–1992), with Burt & Bert Productions, Kline & Friends and Stone Stanley Entertainment
 The Challengers (1990–1991), with Dick Clark Productions and Ron Greenberg Productions
 The Disney Afternoon (1990–1997)
 Adventures of the Gummi Bears (1985–1991)
 DuckTales (1987–1990)
 Chip 'n Dale: Rescue Rangers (1989–1990)
 TaleSpin (1990–1991)
 Darkwing Duck (1991–1992)
 Goof Troop (1992)
 Bonkers (1993–1994)
 Sing Me a Story with Belle (1995-1997), with Patrick Davidson Productions
Sabrina: The Animated Series (1999–2000), with DIC Productions L.P., Riverdale Productions and Kent/QMA, Savage Studios Ltd. and Hartbreak Films
Bone Chillers (1996), with Hyperion Pictures and The Fred Silverman Company
 The Tony Danza Show (2004–2006), with Riverward Productions and Katie Face Productions
 The Wayne Brady Show (2001–2004)
 Win Ben Stein's Money (1997–2003), with Valleycrest Productions and Paramount Global's Comedy Central 
 Today's Business (1986–1987), a business-oriented morning show that cost $500,000 a month to make
 Your Big Break (1999–2001)
 Who Wants to Be a Millionaire (1999–2019), with Valleycrest Productions, Times Square Studios, and 2waytraffic (Show format originally created by Celador); 2020 reboot produced by Valleycrest Productions, Embassy Row and Kimmelot

References

External links
  Company Profile at Yahoo Finance

American companies established in 1985
Disney Media Networks
Television production companies of the United States
Television syndication distributors
Disney production studios
Entertainment companies based in California
Companies based in Burbank, California
Mass media companies established in 1985
1985 establishments in California